Charles Davis (February 12, 1927 – January 10, 2018) was an American sports shooter. He competed in the 50 metre running target event at the 1972 Summer Olympics.

References

1927 births
2018 deaths
American male sport shooters
Olympic shooters of the United States
Shooters at the 1972 Summer Olympics
People from Hazard, Kentucky
Sportspeople from Kentucky